Sven-Agne Larsson (6 October 1925 – 5 January 2006) was a Swedish football midfielder and later manager.

References

1925 births
2006 deaths
Swedish footballers
BK Häcken players
Association football midfielders
Swedish football managers
BK Häcken managers
Örgryte IS managers
Åtvidabergs FF managers
Halmstads BK managers
Hamarkameratene managers
Allsvenskan managers
Superettan managers
Swedish expatriate football managers
Expatriate football managers in Norway
Swedish expatriate sportspeople in Norway